Goniosema is a genus of moths in the subfamily Arctiinae. The genus was described by Turner in 1899.

Species
Goniosema anguliscripta (Lucas, 1890)
Goniosema euraphota Turner, 1940

References

External links

Lithosiini
Moth genera